Brian McGovern (born 28 April 1980) is an Irish former footballer who played as a defender.

Club career
McGovern was born in Dublin. A former Irish U18 and U21 player, he joined Arsenal as a trainee in summer 1997. He made a single appearance for Arsenal against Newcastle United on 14 May 2000, in which a youthful Arsenal side lost 4–2. While with the Gunners, McGovern also had a short loan spell with QPR. Norwich City manager Bryan Hamilton signed McGovern for a fee of £50,000 in August 2000.

McGovern was unable to establish himself in the first team at Carrow Road, scoring once against Tranmere Rovers, and was released in October 2002. He joined Peterborough United but after failing to establish himself there also, and returned to Ireland when a move to Inverness Caledonian Thistle fell through. Briefly with St Patrick's Athletic before going to Longford Town, where again a move to Calley fell through in autumn 2004.

He was signed by the seasiders from Shamrock Rovers, who had signed him on loan from Longford Town, where he had failed to command a place.

McGovern departed from Bray Wanderers in December 2006, having made a total of 40 appearances.

Sources
Canary Citizens by Mark Davage, John Eastwood, Kevin Platt, published by Jarrold Publishing, (2001),

References

External links
Career information at ex-canaries.co.uk
Brian McGovern career stats at Soccerbase

Living people
1980 births
Association football defenders
Arsenal F.C. players
Norwich City F.C. players
Queens Park Rangers F.C. players
Peterborough United F.C. players
Republic of Ireland association footballers
Republic of Ireland under-21 international footballers
Premier League players
English Football League players
St Patrick's Athletic F.C. players
Longford Town F.C. players
Shamrock Rovers F.C. players
Bray Wanderers F.C. players
League of Ireland players
Cherry Orchard F.C. players